Dumiti (also Romanized as Dūmītī; also known as Dīmītī) is a village in Jam Rural District, in the Central District of Jam County, Bushehr Province, Iran. At the 2006 census, its population was 67, in 16 families.

References 

Populated places in Jam County